Club Nautico di Roma is a private yacht club located in Rome, Italy. It was founded in November 2006. It promotes and organizes various water-sports related events, in sailing, motor boating, fishing and scuba diving.

History
Club Nautico di Roma and its Mascalzone Latino team were announced as the official Challenger of Record of the 34th America's Cup, but withdrew on May 12, 2011 citing challenges in agreeing with their sponsors on a budget sufficient to fund a competitive team.

References

External links
Official Website
Phuket Scuba Diving

Yacht clubs in Italy
America's Cup yacht clubs
2006 establishments in Italy
Diving clubs